The National Academy of Mime and Acting (NAMA), was a school in Stockholm for acting and mime. This institution was also known under additional different names in English, including Stockholm University College of Acting and Stockholm Academy of Dramatic Arts.

The school offered programmes in acting and mime, as well as various shorter courses.

The school originated in the acting school founded in 1787 on the initiative of King Gustav III and long appended to the Royal Dramatic Theatre. The Royal Dramatic Training Academy produced many later famous actors and directors, including Greta Garbo, Gustaf Molander, Alf Sjöberg, Ingrid Bergman, Signe Hasso, Gunnar Björnstrand, Max von Sydow and Bibi Andersson. In 1964 the school separated from the Royal Dramatic Theatre (initiated by Ingmar Bergman who claimed the theatre no longer had room for it in the building). The acting schools affiliated with the city theatres in Malmö and Gothenburg were made independent state institutions at the same time, and one which existed in Norrköping/Linköping was closed down.

The Stockholm school was known as the National Swedish School of Acting, Stockholm ( or Scenskolan) from 1964 until 1977, when the name was finally changed to Teaterhögskolan i Stockholm. Here famous actors such as Peter Stormare, Pernilla August and Lena Olin were trained. The Malmö and Gothenburg schools were merged with the universities of Lund and Gothenburg, respectively, but the Stockholm institution remained independent.

On 1 January 2011 the school merged with the Swedish Institute of Dramatic Art to become Stockholm Academy of Dramatic Arts.

Selected tutors (from 2005-)
Stina Ekblad, Professor in the Performing Arts
Krister Henriksson, Professor in The Performing Art
Matthew Allen, Actor training, Acting for the camera

Selected students (by graduation year)

1969
Tomas Bolme
Louise Edlind

1970
Peter Harryson

1971
Lena-Pia Bernhardsson

1972
Tomas Pontén
Basia Frydman

1973
Kjell Bergqvist

1974
Thomas Oredsson

1975
Ulf Dohlsten
Marika Lindström

1976
Robert Sjöblom

1977
Pontus Gustafson
Jacob Nordenson
Rico Rönnbäck
Jan Waldekranz

1978
Lennart R. Svensson

1979
Dan Ekborg
Lena Olin

1980
Babben Larsson

1981
Peter Stormare
Jessica Zandén
Maria Johansson
Sissela Kyle
Tomas Norström

1982
Pernilla August (as Pernilla Östergren)
Gunnel Fred

1984
Thorsten Flinck
Peter Dalle
Claes Månsson

1985
Pia Johansson
Marie Richardson

1986
Gunilla Röör
Lena Endre

1987
Jakob Eklund
Douglas Johansson
Jan Mybrand

1988
Helena Bergström
Katarina Ewerlöf
Benny Haag

1990
Reuben Sallmander
Anna-Lena Hemström
Niklas Hjulström

1991
Figge Norling
Torkel Petersson
Ann-Sofi Rase

1992
Simon Norrthon

1994
Melinda Kinnaman
Elin Klinga
Bernard Bragg

1995
Gustaf Hammarsten

1997
Maria Bonnevie
Alexandra Rapaport

1998
Jonas Karlsson
Magnus Krepper
Eva Röse
Tanja Svedjeström

1999
Lina Englund
Irma Schultz Keller
Lo Wahl

2000
Martin Aliaga

2001
Sofia Bach
Suzanna Dilber
Sofia Helin
Vanna Rosenberg
Joakim Nätterqvist

2002
Katarina Cohen
Emil Forselius
Henrik Norlén
Jonatan Rodriguez

2003
David Dencik
Göran Gillinger
Gustaf Skarsgård

2004
Ellen Mattsson

2005
Petra Hultgren

2006
Johan Hallström
Liv Mjönes

2007
Hanna Alström
Hannes Meidal
Nina Zanjani

2008
Tove Edfeldt

Footnotes

References

External links
Stockholm Academy of Dramatic Arts

Stockholm University of the Arts
National Academy of Mime and Acting
Educational institutions established in 1964
1964 establishments in Sweden
Educational institutions disestablished in 2011
2011 disestablishments in Sweden